The White House, also known as the James Butterfield House, is a historic home located at Hartwick in Otsego County, New York.  It was built about 1792 in the Federal style, and remodeled about 1940 with Colonial Revival style elements.  It is a two-story, five bay, "L"-shaped frame dwelling sheathed in white clapboard.  Also on the property are the contributing corn crib (c. 1860–1900), four bay bank barn (c. 1870), and brick library / bookstore (1948-1949).

It was listed on the National Register of Historic Places in 2011.

References

Houses on the National Register of Historic Places in New York (state)
Federal architecture in New York (state)
Colonial Revival architecture in New York (state)
Houses completed in 1792
Buildings and structures in Otsego County, New York
National Register of Historic Places in Otsego County, New York